Bogue Falema Creek is a stream in the U.S. state of Mississippi. It is a tributary to Potterchitto Creek.

Bogue Falema is a name derived from the Choctaw language perhaps meaning "branch or prong of a stream". Variant names are "Bogue", "Boguefelema Creek", "Felammie Creek", and "Philemma Creek".

References

Rivers of Mississippi
Rivers of Newton County, Mississippi
Mississippi placenames of Native American origin